Diep River is a suburb in Cape Town, South Africa, named after the Diep River that runs through the area. The suburb is bordered by Heathfield to the south and Plumstead to the north. Diep River railway station is on the main line from Cape Town to Simon's Town.

References

Suburbs of Cape Town